Elections to Glasgow City Council were held on 3 May 2012, the same day as the other Scottish local government elections. The election was the second using 21 new wards created as a result of the Local Governance (Scotland) Act 2004, each ward elected three or four councillors using the single transferable vote system form of proportional representation.

The election in Glasgow attracted the most attention out of the local elections in Scotland as there were many predictions that the Scottish Labour would lose control of the council due to losses of seats to the Scottish National Party. The Labour administration had suffered from a number of defections of council members to the newly formed Glasgow First party and controversy surrounding Councillor's salaries and contracts. In the end, Labour remained in control, losing just one seat, while the SNP gained five. The Scottish Liberal Democrats were reduced to holding just one seat on the council, the same numbers as the Scottish Conservatives (who retained their solitary seat) and Glasgow First. The Scottish Greens retained five seats on the authority.

After the elections Labour again formed a controlling administration on the City Council.

Election result

Note: "Votes" are the first preference votes. The net gain/loss and percentage changes relate to the result of the previous Scottish local elections on 3 May 2007. This may differ from other published sources showing gain/loss relative to seats held at dissolution of Scotland's councils.

Ward summary

|- class= "unsortable" align= "centre"
! rowspan= "2" style= "text-align:left;"|Ward
! % 
!Seats
! %
!Seats
! %
!Seats
! %
!Seats
! %
!Seats
! %
!Seats
! %
!Seats
!rowspan= 2|Total
|- class= "unsortable" style= "text-align:center;"
!colspan= 2 | Labour
!colspan= 2 | SNP
!colspan= 2 | Conservative
!colspan= 2 | Green
!colspan= 2 | Lib Dem
!colspan= 2 | Glasgow First
! colspan= "2" | <span>Others
|-
|align= "left"|Linn
|46.04
|2
|29.44
|1
|7.03
|0
|2.73
|0
|12.09
|1
|1.06
|0
|1.61
|0
|4
|-
|align= "left"|Newlands/Auldburn
|40.98
|2
|36.11
|1
|10.77
|0
|3.61
|0
|1.56
|0
|0.71
|0
|6.26
|0
|3
|-
|align= "left"|Greater Pollok
|47.65
|2
|34.03
|2
|3.73
|0
|2.11
|0
|1.12
|0
|8.23
|0
|3.13
|0
|4
|-
|align= "left"|Craigton
|53.4
|2
|31.4
|2
|3.6
|0
|2.1
|0
|0.9
|0
|1.8
|0
|6.8
|0
|4
|-
|align= "left"|Govan
|32.22
|2
|32.63
|1
|3.16
|0
|3.31
|0
|1.26
|0
|14.46
|1
|12.98
|0
|4
|-
|align= "left"|Pollokshields
|24.19
|1
|40.93
|1
|22.15
|1
|8.04
|0
|2.91
|0
|0.57
|0
|1.20
|0
|3
|-
|align= "left"|Langside 
|35.80
|1
|37.61
|1
|7.38
|0
|8.50
|1
|7.25
|0
|1.03
|0
|2.42
|0
|3
|-
|align= "left"|Southside Central
|44.3
|2
|35.81
|2
|2.50
|0
|6.40
|0
|0.79
|0
|0.0
|0
|10.19
|0
|4
|-
|align= "left"|Calton
|54.6
|2
|30
|1
|2.6
|0
|3.0
|0
|0.9
|0
|2.9
|0
|6
|0
|3
|-
|align= "left"|Anderston/City
|50.3
|2
|29.6
|1
|4.7
|0
|10.5
|1
|1.7
|0
|0.4
|0
|2.9
|0
|4
|-
|align= "left"|Hillhead
|29.45
|2
|33.06
|1
|6.54
|0
|17.62
|1
|4.10
|0
|0.22
|0
|9.01
|0
|4
|-
|align= "left"|Partick West
|32.1
|1
|33.5
|2
|10.33
|0
|14.71
|1
|5.54
|0
|0.29
|0
|3.53
|0
|4
|-
|align= "left"|Garscadden/Scotstounhill
|61.6
|3
|27.1
|1
|2.6
|0
|2.7
|0
|1.1
|0
|0.3
|0
|4.6
|0
|4
|-
|align= "left"|Drumchapel/Anniesland
|61.36
|3
|29.26
|1
|3.62
|0
|2.63
|0
|1.96
|0
|0.30
|0
|0.87
|0
|4
|-
|align= "left"|Maryhill/Kelvin
|39.6
|2
|34.4
|2
|7.7
|0
|7.3
|0
|9.2
|0
|0.0
|0.0
|1.9
|0
|4
|-
|align= "left"|Canal
|44.5
|2
|31.27
|1
|2.34
|0
|9.27
|1
|1.84
|0
|0.54
|0
|10.23
|0
|4
|-
|align= "left"|Springburn
|57.7
|2
|30
|1
|2.7
|0
|1.5
|0
|1.1
|0
|0.5
|0
|6.4
|0
|3
|-
|align= "left"|East Centre
|58.6
|3
|27.7
|1
|4.0
|0
|4.8
|0
|0.9
|0
|0.6
|0
|3.4
|0
|4
|-
|align= "left"|Shettleston
|60.5
|3
|30.9
|1
|4.2
|0
|1.5
|0
|0.7
|0
|1.4
|0
|0.9
|0
|4
|-
|align= "left"|Baillieston
|50.8
|2
|37.2
|2
|5.2
|0
|1.8
|0
|0.8
|0
|1.8
|0
|2.4
|0
|4
|-
|align= "left"|North East
|63.61
|3
|29.65
|1
|3.13
|0
|1.76
|0
|1.13
|0
|0.00
|0
|0.72
|0
|4
|- class= "unsortable" class= "sortbottom"
!align= "left"| Total
!46.72
!44
!32.57
!27
!5.94
!1
!5.55
!5
!2.93
!1
!1.76
!1
!4.53
!0
!79
|}

Ward results

Ward 1: Linn

Ward 2: Newlands/Auldburn
2007: 2xLab; 1xSNP
2012: 2xLab; 1xSNP 
2007-2012 Change: No change

Ward 3: Greater Pollok
2007: 3xLab; 1xSNP
2012: 2xLab; 2xSNP
2007-2012 Change: SNP gain one seat from Lab

Ward 4: Craigton
2007: 2xLab; 1xSNP; 1xSol 
2012: 2xLab; 2xSNP  
2007-2012 Change: SNP gain one seat from Sol

Ward 5: Govan
2007: 3xLab; 1xSNP 
2012: 2xLab; 1xSNP; 1xGlasgow First 
2007-2012 Change: Glasgow First gain one seat from Lab

Ward 6: Pollokshields
2007: 1xLab; 1xSNP; 1xCon 
2012: 1xLab; 1xSNP; 1xCon  
2007-2012 Change: No change

Ward 7: Langside
2007: 1xSNP; 1xLab; 1xLib Dem 
2012: 1xSNP; 1xLab; 1xGreen  
2007-2012 Change: Green gain one seat from Lib Dem

Result based on original count

Ward 8: Southside Central
2007: 2xLab; 1xSNP; 1xGRN 
2012: 2xLab; 2xSNP  
2007-2012 Change: SNP gain one seat from Green

Ward 9: Calton
2007: 2xLab; 1xSNP 
2012: 2xLab; 1xSNP 
2007-2012 Change: No change

Ward 10: Anderston/City
2007: 2xLab; 1xSNP; 1xGRN 
2012: 2xLab; 1xSNP; 1xGRN 
2007-2012 Change: No change

Ward 11: Hillhead
2007: 1xSNP; 1xGRN; 1xLib Dem; 1xLab 
2012: 1xSNP; 1xGRN; 2xLab  
2007-2012 change: Labour gain one seat from Lib Dem

Ward 12: Partick West
2007: 1xSNP; 1xLib Dem; 1xLab; 1xGRN 
2012: 2xSNP; 1xLab; 1xGRN  
2007-2012 change: SNP gain one seat from Lib Dem

Ward 13: Garscadden/Scotstounhill
2007: 3xLab; 1xSNP 
2012: 3xLab; 1xSNP  
2007-2012 change: No change

Ward 14: Drumchapel/Anniesland
2007: 3xLab; 1xSNP
2012: 3xLab; 1xSNP
2007-2012 change: No change

Ward 15: Maryhill/Kelvin
2007: 2xLab; 1xSNP; 1xLib Dem 
2012: 2xLab; 2xSNP;  
2007-2012 change: SNP gain one seat from Lib Dem

Ward 16: Canal
2007: 2xLab; 1xSNP; 1xGRN 
2012: 2xLab; 1xSNP; 1xGRN  
2007-2012 change: No change

Ward 17: Springburn
2007: 2xLab; 1xSNP 
2012: 2xLab; 1xSNP  
2007-2012 Change: No change

Ward 18: East Centre
2007: 3xLab; 1xSNP 
2012: 3xLab; 1xSNP  
2007-2012 changes: No change

Ward 19: Shettleston
2007: 3xLab; 1xSNP  
2012: 3xLab; 1xSNP  
2007-2012 Change: No change

Ward 20: Baillieston
2007: 2xLab; 2xSNP  
2012: 2xLab; 2xSNP  
2007-2012 changes: No change

Ward 21: North East
2007: 3xLab; 1xSNP  
2012: 3xLab; 1xSNP  
2007-2012 changes: No change

By-elections since 2013

October 2013 Govan by-election
On 23 July 2013 SNP councillor Allison Hunter died from cancer. A by-election was held on 10 October 2013 and was won by Labour's John Kane.

December 2013 Shettleston by-election
On 7 October 2013 Shettleston Labour councillor George Ryan died suddenly. A by-election was held on 5 December 2013 and the seat was retained by Labour's Martin Neill.

August 2015 by-elections
On 14 May 2015, Green Party councillor Liam Hainey (Langside) resigned his seat for family and health reasons. On the same day, SNP councillors Alison Thewliss (Calton) and Martin Docherty (Anderston/City) resigned their seats after having been elected as MPs for the constituencies of, respectively, Glasgow Central and West Dunbartonshire. Finally, on 10 June 2015, SNP councillor Iris Gibson (Craigton) retired due to ill health. By-elections for all of these were held on 6 August 2015.

May 2016 Anderston/City by-election
On 14 March 2016, Labour counsellor Matheson resigned his seat as he had been appointed a visiting professor at Strathclyde University. As a result, a by-election happened on 5 May 2016: it was won by the SNP's Angus Millar.

October 2016 Garscadden/Scotstounhill by-election
On 25 July 2016, Labour counsellor John Kelly died as a result of motor neuron disease. A by-election was held on 6 October 2016 and was won by the SNP's Chris Cunningham.

References

2012 Scottish local elections
2012
2010s in Glasgow